Guinean National Olympic and Sports Committee (IOC code: GUI) is the National Olympic Committee representing Guinea.

References

External links
IOC website

Guinea
Guinea at the Olympics
Olympic
Sports organizations established in 1964